Gray Mountain (US) or Grey Mountain (UK) may refer to:

Places
Gray Mountain, Arizona,  unincorporated community in Coconino County, Arizona
Gray Mountain (Kentucky), a mountain in Kentucky, location of John Shell Cabin
Gray Mountain, a summit in Missouri
Gray Mountain, Peloncillo Mountains (Hidalgo County) New Mexico - site of Battle of Mount Gray
Gray Mountain, Whitehorse, Yukon, in Canada

Books
Gray Mountain (John Grisham novel)